Güyüm (also, Gyugyum) is a village in the Ismailli Rayon of Azerbaijan.  The village forms part of the municipality of Diyallı.

References 

Populated places in Ismayilli District